Hospital accreditation has been defined as “A self-assessment and external peer assessment process used by health care organizations to accurately assess their level of performance in relation to established standards and to implement ways to continuously improve”. Critically, accreditation is not just about standard-setting: there are analytical, counseling and self-improvement dimensions to the process.  There are parallel issues in evidence-based medicine, quality assurance and medical ethics (see below), and the reduction of medical error is a key role of the accreditation process. Hospital accreditation is therefore one component in the maintenance of patient safety. However, there is limited and contested evidence supporting the effectiveness of accreditation programs.

Background
Hospitals and healthcare services are vital components of any well-ordered and humane society, and will indisputably be the recipients of societal resources.  That hospitals should be places of safety, not only for patients but also for the staff and for the general public, is of the greatest importance. Quality of hospitals and healthcare services is also of great interest to many other bodies, including governments, NGOs targeting healthcare and social welfare, professional organisations representing doctors, patient organisations, shareholders of companies providing healthcare services, etc.  However, accreditation schemes are not the same thing as government-controlled initiatives set up to assess healthcare providers with only governmental objectives in mind - ideally, the functioning and finance of hospital accreditation schemes should be independent of governmental control.

How quality is maintained and improved in hospitals and healthcare services is the subject of much debate.  Hospital surveying and accreditation is one recognised means by which this can be achieved.

It is not just an issue of hospital quality.  There are financial factors as well.  For example, in the USA, up until recently the Joint Commission exercised a de facto veto over whether or not US hospitals and other health providers were able to participate, and therefore earn from, the Medicare and Medicaid programs.  This situation has changed in recent years.

National schemes

Accreditation schemes recognised as providers of national healthcare accreditation services include:
 Accreditation Association for Ambulatory Health Care (AAAHC) - based in the United States 
 American Accreditation Commission International (AACI) - based in the United States 
 CHKS Ltd is a specialist provider of healthcare accreditation programmes to UK and international healthcare providers, based in the UK and accredited to ISQua and ISO 17021:2015 standards. www.chks.co.uk
The Council  for Health Service Accreditation of Southern Africa www.cohsasa.co.za
 Malaysian Society for Quality in Health, or MSQH - based in Malaysia
 QHA Trent Accreditation - based in the UK-Europe 
 The National Safety and Quality Health Service Standards (NSQHS Standards) developed by the Australian Commission on Safety and Quality in Health Care (ACSQHC) 
 Australian Council for Healthcare Standards International, or ACHSI  - based in Australia 
 Accreditation Canada, formerly known as Canadian Council on Health Services Accreditation, or CCHSA  - based in Canada 
 Healthcare Facilities Accreditation Program (HFAP)  -based in the United States 
 The Joint Commission (TJC)  - based in the United States 
 Community Health Accreditation Program (CHAP)  - based in the United States 
 Accreditation Commission for Health Care Inc. (ACHC)  - based in the United States 
 The Compliance Team: "Exemplary Provider Programs"  - based in the United States 
 Healthcare Quality Association on Accreditation (HQAA)  - based in the United States 
 DNV GL - based in Norway and the United States  
 Thailand Hospital HA - based in Bangkok, Thailand 
 Taiwan Joint Commission on Hospital Accreditation (財團法人醫院評鑑暨醫療品質策進會) - based in Taipei, Taiwan 
 La Haute Autorité de Santé, French National Authority for Health, based in Paris, France 
 A.N.M.C.S., National Authority of Quality Management in Health, based in Bucharest, Romania 
 National Accreditation Board for Hospitals & Healthcare Providers (NABH) based in India 

The different accreditation schemes vary in quality, size, intent and the skill of their marketing. They also vary considerably in terms of the cost incurred by hospitals and healthcare institutions.  They have varying degrees of commitment to assessing medical ethical standards and clinical standards.

International schemes
Some accreditation schemes also undertake international healthcare accreditation work outside of their base country. One of the large number of accreditation schemes in the United States, the Joint Commission (TJC) currently being the best known, has created Joint Commission International, or JCI.  In recent years, DNV have been challenging TJC in the USA. Accreditation Canada accredited its first organization internationally in 1967 in Bermuda. In 2010, Accreditation Canada International (ACI) was created to provide accreditation to hospitals, clinics, primary care centers and health systems. Acreditas Global (formerly AAAHC International) has been present in Peru since 2012 and Costa Rica.

The former Trent Accreditation Scheme (TAS) from the UK was the first to accredit a hospital in Asia, in Hong Kong in 2000 , and QHA Trent Accreditation from the UK have continue to work in the same field.  Since TAS started the process, others, such as JCI and ACI, have entered the market.

DNV Healthcare is a Norwegian-US health care accrediting organisation providing a quality management system constructed in accordance with ISO 9001 and approved by the U.S. Centers for Medicare and Medicaid Services (CMS).

CHKS Ltd is a specialist international provider of healthcare accreditation programmes based in the UK and accredited to ISQua and ISO 17021:2011 standards www.chks.co.uk

AACI is an international accreditation provider based in Hendersonville, NC, USA and accredited to ISQua, as well as ISO 17021:2015 standards www.aacihealthcare.com 

The OECI is an international organization of cancer centers with an accreditation and designation programme and accredited to ISQua.

The Council for Health Service Accreditation of Southern Africa (COHSASA) is the only internationally accredited quality improvement and accreditation body for healthcare facilities in Africa. In the past 23 years over 600 facilities throughout the continent have entered the COHSASA program to improve the quality and safety of healthcare provided to patients. COHSASA holds a fourth consecutive accreditation by the International Society for Quality in Health Care (ISQua), the global authority responsible for ensuring health accreditors themselves meet standards.

See also
 Health insurance
 List of healthcare accreditation organizations in the United States
 United Kingdom Accreditation Forum

References

External links
Role of WHO in hospital accreditation. © 2004 WHO Regional Office for the Eastern Mediterranean
Partners Harvard Medical International: Making Quality the Competitive Edge.
 United Kingdom Accreditation Forum.
 Robinson R.  Book Review - "Accreditation: Protecting the Professional or the Consumer?" BMJ 1995;311:818-819.
Gupta J & Das B.  Developing national accreditation systems: Needs, challenges & future directions.  Express Healthcare Management, November 2005. © Indian Express Newspapers (Mumbai) Limited.
Documents for Hospital Accreditation as per NABH 5th Edition

Quality assurance
Accreditation
Accreditation in healthcare